The Monument to Antonio Maura is an instance of public art in Palma de Mallorca, Spain. Designed by Mariano Benlliure, it consists of a sculptural ensemble dedicated to Antonio Maura.

History and description
The monument was funded by popular subscription, and the design was awarded to Mariano Benlliure. The standing bronze statue of Antonio Maura, depicted in oratorical attitude, tops off the stone pedestal. Placed below Maura, an allegory of Truth made of white marble completes the ensemble. Truth is depicted pointing at a cartouche reading  ("Antonio Maura equaled thought with [his] life"), adapted from a verse from  Epístola moral a Fabio.

The monument was unveiled at its location in the Plaça del Mercat on 13 December 1929, on occasion of the 4th anniversary of the death of Maura. The statue was toppled and damaged on 11 November 2014 by the fall of a nearby ficus. After undergoing a restoration process, the statue returned to the Plaça del Mercat a year later.

References
Citations

Bibliography
 
 

Monuments and memorials in the Balearic Islands
Bronze sculptures in Spain
Outdoor sculptures in Spain
Buildings and structures in Palma de Mallorca
Sculptures by Mariano Benlliure
Sculptures of men in Spain
Statues of politicians